is a Japanese condiment made from lacto-fermented bamboo shoots. The bamboo shoots are dried in the sun or through other means before the process of fermentation. Menma is a common topping for noodle soups, notably ramen. Menma is primarily produced in China, with brands imported from southern China and Taiwan being popular.

Etymology

The trading company that would later become Marumatsu Bussan had been exporting dried bamboo shoots produced in Taiwan as shinachiku. In 1946, responding to a formal objection to the use of the term Shina from the Taiwanese government, the Japanese Foreign Ministry issued a memorandum recommending that the term be avoided. Marumatsu Bussan founder Shūsui Matsumura claims that he came up with the new product name menma, a portmanteau of ramen (拉麺) and machiku (麻竹), the type of bamboo from which it is made, after seeing it served atop ramen in Yokohama Chinatown. This name could not be trademarked but gradually became accepted as the common name for the condiment as its popularity grew in Japan.

Menma is not, however, customarily eaten atop noodles in Taiwan; the vegetable toppings on the popular noodle dish Zhajiangmian, 菜碼 (Pinyin: càimǎ) were once called 麵碼 (miànmǎ).

See also
 Talabaw
 Tsukemono

References

External links
 Recipe at RecipeZaar.com
 Măng khô Asay food 

Japanese condiments
Chinese cuisine
Toppings
Plant-based fermented foods